Wila’, also Bila’ and Lowland Semang, are extinct Mon–Khmer languages of Malaya recorded on the Wellesley coast opposite Penang in the early 19th century.

References

Languages of Malaysia
Aslian languages